Larak Rural District is a rural district (dehestan) in the Shahab District of Qeshm County, Hormozgan Province, Iran. At the 2006 census, its population was 466, in 98 families.  The rural district has 1 village.

References 

Rural Districts of Hormozgan Province
Qeshm County